Podkina is a rural locality (a village) in Yurlinskoye Rural Settlement, Yurlinsky District, Perm Krai, Russia. The population was 31 as of 2010. There are 4 streets.

Geography 
Podkina is located 23 km southwest of Yurla (the district's administrative centre) by road. Zarubina is the nearest rural locality.

References 

Rural localities in Yurlinsky District